Element Magazine is an Asian men's online magazine that focuses on fashion and lifestyle. Its coverage includes art, grooming, music, entertainment, social issues and travel. It is published bi-monthly in Singapore by Epic Media.

History 

Element Magazine has been described as the first alternative high-fashion and lifestyle men's journal with featured stories connected to the Asian LGBTQI community in particular, and it is launched and based in Singapore. The magazine was established by Noel Ng and Hiro Mizuhara in March 2013.
The decision to launch the magazine on digital platforms enabled the publishers to side-step Singapore's regulation of print media and meant it had no need to obtain a media license. It uses an Internet host server in the United States. Normative and positive depictions of gay people in mainstream media are currently banned in Singapore by the Media Development Authority (MDA). The magazine boasts an average digital circulation of more than 15,000 since its launch. It is also the organizer of Asia Pink Awards, a regional Awards event that celebrates those campaigning for LGBTQI acceptance in Asia

Editorial 

Element Magazine often promotes and features sexual health related contents and campaigns besides fashion and lifestyle. In 2013, it launched a visual campaign to promote HIV/AIDS awareness in World AIDS Day 2013.

References

External links
 Official website
 Asia Pink Awards official website

2013 establishments in Singapore
Gay men's magazines
Magazines established in 2013
Men's fashion magazines
Bi-monthly magazines